Rovinari is a town in Gorj County, Oltenia, Romania. A large coal burning electric power plant it is located near the town. Surface and underground lignite coal mines operate in the surrounding area. It officially became a town in 1981, as a result of the Romanian rural systematization program.

Natives
 Theodor Costescu

References

Towns in Romania
Populated places in Gorj County
Localities in Oltenia
Mining communities in Romania
Monotowns in Romania